Gurab Pas (also Romanized as Gūrāb Pas; also known as Kurapas) is a village in Gurab Pas Rural District, in the Central District of Fuman County, Gilan Province, Iran. At the 2006 census, its population was 1,734, in 444 families.

References 

Populated places in Fuman County